The 2010 William Jones Cup was the 32nd tournament which took place in Taipei from 14–20 July.

Men

Standings

Results

All-tournament team

 Lee Hsueh-lin
 Yuta Tabuse
 Samad Nikkhah Bahrami (MVP)
 Takuya Kawamura
 Marcus Douthit

Women

Preliminary round

Knockout round

All-tournament team

 Liu Chun-yi
 Kim Na-Youn (MVP)
 Darya Li
 Wen Chi
 Park Ha-Na

External links
 Asia-Basket

2010
2010–11 in Taiwanese basketball
2010–11 in Asian basketball
2010–11 in Australian basketball